Hugo Alberto Pedrero (born 1995) is a Spanish sprint canoeist.

He won a gold medal at the 2019 ICF Canoe Sprint World Championships.

References

1995 births
Living people
Spanish male canoeists
ICF Canoe Sprint World Championships medalists in Canadian
21st-century Spanish people